James Eugene MacColl (27 June 1908 – 17 June 1971) was a British Labour politician.

He was the younger son of Hugo MacColl, a master marine engineer. At the age of 12 he was orphaned. MacColl was educated at Sedbergh School and Balliol College, Oxford. At Oxford he became secretary of the University Labour club. He graduated with degrees in philosophy, politics and economics.

Following his graduation he received a Commonwealth Fund fellowship and spent two years at Chicago University in the United States. He was called to the bar at the Inner Temple in 1933, and practiced on the North East Circuit.

He subsequently moved to Paddington, London, and became a member of the borough council. He was mayor of Paddington in 1947 - 1949. His interest in education led to him being co-opted on to the London County Council education committee from 1936 to 1946. He was appointed a justice of the peace in 1938, and was chairman of the North London Juvenile Court from 1949 to 1964 and of the Camden Juvenile Court from 1964 to his death. MacColl believed in the importance of local government and co-authored two books on the subject.

At the 1950 general election he was elected Member of Parliament for Widnes, and held the seat for two decades until his death in 1971 aged 62. From 1964 to 1969, he was Parliamentary Secretary to the Minister for Housing and Local Government.

MacColl was an active "High Anglican" member of the Church of England, and was a member of the church's Board for Social Responsibility. He was unmarried.

References

External links 
 

1908 births
1971 deaths
Labour Party (UK) MPs for English constituencies
Members of the Fabian Society
UK MPs 1950–1951
UK MPs 1951–1955
UK MPs 1955–1959
UK MPs 1959–1964
UK MPs 1964–1966
UK MPs 1966–1970
UK MPs 1970–1974
People educated at Sedbergh School
Alumni of Balliol College, Oxford
Members of the Inner Temple
Members of Paddington Metropolitan Borough Council
Mayors of places in Greater London
20th-century British lawyers
Ministers in the Wilson governments, 1964–1970